The 8th Nongshim Cup began on 16 October 2007 and concluded on 22 February 2008, with Chang Hao winning four rounds in a row to lead Team China to their first victory.

Teams

Results

First round

Second round

Final round

References

2007 in go
Nongshim Cup